Warpig is a Canadian rock band. They gained a fan following in the Ontario club circuit in the 1970s and performed shows with Wishbone Ash, Savoy Brown, Manfred Mann, Quicksilver Messenger Service, and Mahogany Rush.

History

Formation and album release (1968–1973)
Before forming Warpig in 1968, band members Rick Donmoyer, Thomas "Dana" Snitch, Terry Hook, and Terry Brett had played and toured in several other Canadian rock groups, including Mass Destruction, Wot and The Kingbees. They signed with independent label Fonthill Records and at Sound Canada studios recorded their debut album in 1970, engineered by Ken Friesan. In 1973, London Records re-released the Warpig album with new cover art and two tracks re-recorded at Toronto Sound with Terry Brown, producer for Canadian rock icons Rush. Later, between June and July of that year, the re-recorded version of Warpigs single "Rock Star" made the RPM charts for 7 seven weeks peaking at 52.

Breakup and reunion (1974–1975, 2004–present)
Members Terry Hook and Dana Snitch left the band between 1974 and 1975; the group eventually disbanded. Rick Donmoyer later toured with the band Ash Mountain. Warpig reunited in 2004 after copies of their debut album starting attracting high prices on eBay. Their self-titled album was officially reissued in 2006 on Relapse Records, though many bootlegged versions on CD and vinyl continued to show up. The album was digitally re-mastered by Peter Moore (Cowboy Junkies), and featured a new artwork layout created by artist Orion Landau. The CD version of Warpig was released by Relapse in October 2006.

Thomas "Dana" Snitch passed away in March 2021.

Discography
 Warpig (originally released by Fonthill Records in 1970; re-released by London Records in 1973, and then re-released in 2006 on Relapse)

References

Musical groups established in 1968
Musical groups disestablished in 1975
Musical groups reestablished in 2004
Musical groups from Ontario
Woodstock, Ontario
Canadian hard rock musical groups
Canadian heavy metal musical groups
Canadian psychedelic rock music groups
Canadian progressive rock groups
Relapse Records artists
1968 establishments in Ontario
1975 disestablishments in Ontario
2004 establishments in Ontario